Eugen Wilhelm is an Austrian cross-country skier. He represented Austria at the 1976 Winter Paralympics held in Örnsköldsvik, Sweden and he competed in three events in cross-country skiing.

He won the bronze medal in the Men's 3x10 km Relay III-IV B event together with Wolfgang Pickl and Josef Scheiber.

References 

Living people
Year of birth missing (living people)
Place of birth missing (living people)
Cross-country skiers at the 1976 Winter Paralympics
Medalists at the 1976 Winter Paralympics
Paralympic bronze medalists for Austria
Paralympic medalists in cross-country skiing
Paralympic cross-country skiers of Austria
20th-century Austrian people